Royal Bay Secondary School (RBSS) is a secondary school located in Colwood, a western suburb of Victoria, British Columbia, Canada. It is one of three secondary schools in School District 62 Sooke right now and serves the suburban West Shore area of Colwood, Langford and Metchosin.

History and facilities

RBSS was established in 2015 as one of two new facilities to replace the former Belmont Secondary School on Jacklin Road in Langford.

In September 2013 construction commenced on the new $40.8-million RBSS.  Shortly after construction started for the new RBSS building, local media noted that the school is located in the former gravel pit where the remains of a wooly mammoth were discovered in the 1960s.  Part of the remains are now in the collection of the Royal British Columbia Museum.

In March 2018, a major building expansion was announced. Construction commenced January 2019 on the new $34-million 600 seat addition made up of 19 additional class rooms including 4 science labs and 2 state-of-the-art computer animation rooms, a third gymnasia featuring indoor artificial-turf, 2 additional athletic change rooms and office, two new parking lots, and a bus lane out front of the School property. Construction was completed October 2020 making RBSS the biggest Secondary School on Vancouver Island.

Following the competition of the expansion, it was announced that the School District 62 French Immersion Program, currently at Belmont Secondary School, would be transitioned and permanently moved to Royal Bay Secondary School. The transition started in September of 2021, and is set to complete in September of 2024.

The facilities are intended to support a wide range of programs, including expanded students' skills and trades training. The athletic facilities include three gymnasia, an Olympic size rubberized track, one artificial-turf play field, one grass play field, as well as a roof-top basketball court. The school incorporates the Teechamitsa Theatre, a 350-seat performing arts theatre which supports the drama and orchestra program.
Career and Technical Education spaces included shop work areas for construction, auto/marine, and mechanical/marine courses.
The school incorporates a Neighbourhood Learning Centre to support both the school and community needs.

Academies and special programs
RBSS offers academies and special programs in several areas:
 Soccer Academy
 Dance Academy
 Lacrosse Academy
 Girls' Lacrosse Academy 
 French Immersion (starting September 2021)
 Culinary Arts
 Equine Studies
 Dual Credit –  in partnership with Camosun College, it is a dedicated trades program focusing on construction, plumbing, electrical, sheet metal, and pipe fitting where students can earn both high school and college credits.

References

External links
 Royal Bay Secondary School
 Sooke School District #62
 Neighbourhood Learning Centres webpage
 Royal Bay Learning Through Music

High schools in British Columbia
Educational institutions in Canada with year of establishment missing